Shipley Run Historic District is a national historic district located at Wilmington, New Castle County, Delaware. It encompasses 408 contributing buildings in a residential area located west of the Wilmington central business district.  It was developed in the mid- to late-19th century and primarily consists of single-family, attached and semi-detached rowhouse dwellings. They are in a variety of popular Late Victorian architectural styles including Second Empire, Queen Anne, Italianate, and Stick style.

It was added to the National Register of Historic Places in 1984.

Education
Residents are in the Christina School District. They are zoned to Stubbs Early Childhood Center (K-5), Bancroft School (for grades 6–8), and Christiana High School.

References

Queen Anne architecture in Delaware
Second Empire architecture in Delaware
Italianate architecture in Delaware
Historic districts in Wilmington, Delaware
Historic districts on the National Register of Historic Places in Delaware
National Register of Historic Places in Wilmington, Delaware